Gymnobela xaioca is a species of sea snail, a marine gastropod mollusk in the family Raphitomidae.

Description

Distribution
This marine species occurs in the Campos Basin, southeast Brazil.

References

 Figueira R.M. Andrade & Absalão R.S. (2012) Deep-water Raphitomidae (Mollusca, Gastropoda, Conoidea) from the Campos Basin, southeast Brazil. Zootaxa 3527: 1–27

xaioca
Gastropods described in 2012